Pontardawe Town F.C. are a football club based in the town of Pontardawe. They play in the Cymru South, the second tier of the Welsh football pyramid.

History

Although the present club was founded in 1947, football in Pontardawe certainly stretches back over 100 years, into the closing years of the 19th Century, when a Pontardawe club, run by industrialist CF Gilbertson, was among the members of the earliest Swansea League, and won the championship in 1899-1900. The club went on to join the Swansea and District League in the early 1900s, playing familiar names like Swansea Town, Morriston, Skewen and Clydach, as well as long forgotten ones such as Mond Nickel, York Place and Sketty. But honours don't seem to have come their way in the first half of the 20th Century; the club never even reached the top division of the Welsh League and it disbanded during the Second World War. 
 
Reformed as Pontardawe Athletic in 1947, the town club entered the Welsh League, playing in division two (west). The first few postwar years brought reasonable success at this level and by 1959/60 they were challenging for promotion, finishing 3rd behind Carmarthen and Clydach, achieving a Division One place a year later despite finishing below Gelli Colliery. But relegation came swiftly in 1961-62, Ponty finishing 19th out 20 and going back down with Milford. By the mid 1960s the club was struggling in the middle section of the restructured Welsh League and by 1980 they dropped to the lowest division. A period of comparative success followed in the early 1980s, with successive promotions taking the club back to the top flight of the Welsh League by 1982. 1981 / 82 was Ponty's best ever season - not only did Dixie McHale's team win promotion, finishing second to Brecon Corries but they reached the quarter finals of the Welsh Cup, hosting a Wrexham side containing Dai Davies, Joey Jones and Dixie McNeil. (Record books show the result as 5-1 though the club's history says 4-1). 
 
Competing in the Premier Division for only the second time in their history in 1982-83, Pontardawe Athletic managed to lift the West Wales Senior Cup and in the league they held their own, finishing 13th - but luck wasn't on their side, the league restructured and as Athletic lacked a ground adequate for the Welsh league's self styled "National Division" they were dumped back into the middle section, curiously known as the Premier Division, for 1983/84. Ponty went into decline again, slipping back to the third level of the Welsh league by the mid-1980s, quietly remaining there for over a decade. 
 
The first Welsh league championship - of the Third division - finally came in 1996, after 50 years of membership but the club's progress up the league was almost halted on ground criteria again, as council bureaucracy meant Pontardawe were one of the last clubs at this level to erect a covered stand. But the club was now on a definite upward curve, its youth side lifting the Welsh Youth Cup and MacWhirter League title in 1997, and the senior side gaining promotion to the First Division in 1998. This time the club (now adopting the name of Pontardawe Town) lasted 6 seasons and then returned to the top flight for the 2005-06 season after winning the Second Division and losing to Goytre in the Shamrock League Cup final. Their return to the First division saw them finish third in the table and again finishing runners up in the Shamrock League Cup.
 
Between 2005 and 2015 the club was in the top flight and during this time the club won the Reserve League (x2), Reserve Cup (x1), Youth League (x3), Neath League (3rd Div) and at Under 18s the SWFA League (x1), WWYAFL Cup (x1). The club also finished runners up in the 2013/2014 League Cup Final losing on penalties to AFC Porth. Unfortunately the club was relegated to Division Two at the end of the 2014/2015 season. In the 2016 / 2017 season the club’s excellent record at Youth level was confirmed with the Under 19s winning the Welsh League Youth West Division and the Under 18s winning the West Wales Youth League Cup. In the 2017/2018 season the Reserves won the Welsh League Reserve West title
 
In the 2018 / 2019 season the club reached the FAW Trophy Cup Final, its first national senior final , but lost to North Wales side Cefn Albion. Nevertheless this was an outstanding achievement for the club. Also, during the same season, the  Under 18s were crowned West Wales Youth Champions.
 
The management structure for the coming season has now been confirmed with Andrew Stokes, Richard South and Garry Taylor being joined by Steven Hole. Jason Dykes will continue in his role as overall Director of Football and Marcus Westmoreland will run the Youth teams. Last season we also joined the Welsh Premier Development league and this season we will continue this whilst also retaining a Welsh League Youth Presence and an Under 18s in the West Wales Youth League. 
 
Another important factor here at our club, is the Junior Section which is one of the best in the country running over 25 teams including Academy, Minis, Juniors and Girls / Ladies. Success at all age groups means that the trophy cabinets are bursting at the seams and long may this continue.
 
Since the club relocated to Parc Ynysderw the committee has invested time and money to bring the ground to Welsh League standard which it achieved in August 2015. We again have club proudly achieved its Tier 2 License which was an amazing achievement and we now have a wonderful facility. 

The 2021/2022 Season was an amazing one for the club seeing the First Team winning the inaugural Ardal South West League gaining promotion to the JD Cymru South. The Reserve team won the FAW Reserve League West and with the Ladies winning the West Wales Cup and promotion to Adran League the news just got better and better.

Honours

1982–83 : West Wales Senior Cup Winners
1995–96 : Welsh League Division 3 Champions
1996–97 : Welsh Youth Cup Winners
1996–97 : Welsh Youth League Winners
2001–02 : Welsh League Division One Runners-up
2004–05 : Welsh League Cup Runners-up
2005–06 : Welsh League Cup Runners-up
2005–06 : Welsh League Division 2 Champions
2006–07 : Welsh League Youth Cup Runners-up
2007–08 : Welsh League Youth Cup Runners-up
2009–10 : Welsh League Reserve West Champions
2010–11 : Welsh League Reserve Cup Winners
2010–11 : Welsh League Youth Division West Champions
2010–11 : Neath League Division 2 Champions
2011–12 : Ystradgynlais 5 A Side Tournament Winners
2011–12 : Adidas Predator Cup 5 A Side Winners
2011–12 : SWFA Youth League West Champions
2011–12 : Welsh League Youth Division West Champions
2011–12 : Welsh League Reserve Division West Champions
2012–13 : Welsh League Youth Division West Champions
2012–13 : WWYAFL Division A Champions
2012–13 : WWYAFL S&R Trophies Cup Final Winners
2013–14 : Welsh League Cup Runners-up
2016-17 : Welsh League Youth Division West Champions
2016–17 : WWYAFL S&R Trophies Cup Final Winners
2017–18 : Welsh League Reserve Division West Champions
2018-19 : WWYAFL Champions
2018-19 : FAW Trophy Runners up
2021–22 : Ardal SW Champions

Staff 
 President: Herbie Probert
 Chairman: Jason Dykes
 Secretary: Gary Thomas
 1st Team Manager: Garry Taylor
 1st Team Coaches: Geza Hajgato, Jody Thomas
 Reserve Team Manager: Cameron Boe, Marcus Westmoreland, Gareth Govier
 Development Team Managers : Steve Berry, Lee Surman
 Under 18s Team Managers : To Be Confirmed

External links 
 Pontardawe Town FC Website
 JD Cymru Football Website
 Ardal League Website
 West Wales Youth League

Football clubs in Wales
Sport in Neath Port Talbot
1947 establishments in Wales
Welsh Football League clubs
Association football clubs established in 1947
Ardal Leagues clubs
Cymru South clubs